Lap-dog (1823–1838) was a British Thoroughbred racehorse and sire. His racing career consisted of a single season, 1826, during which he ran eight times. After finishing unplaced on his racecourse debut, Lap-dog won his next four races including The Derby. He was retired to stud at the end of the year, but had little success as a sire of winners in England and was later exported to the United States. His name appeared in variations including Lapdog, Lap Dog and The Lap Dog.

Background
Lap-dog was a small bay horse with no white markings, bred by his owner George Wyndham, 3rd Earl of Egremont at his stud at Petworth. He was sired by Whalebone out of Egremont's unnamed Canopus mare making him a full brother to the 1831 Derby winner Spaniel. In addition to the two Derby winners, the Canopus mare also produced Fanchon, the dam of the 1000 Guineas winner Cara. Lap-dog's sire, Whalebone won the 1810 Derby and thirteen other races before becoming a successful and important stallion. He was British Champion sire in 1826 and 1827 and through his son Sir Hercules, is the male-line ancestor of most modern Thoroughbreds.

Racing career

1826: three-year-old season

On Wednesday 12 April, Lap-dog made his first appearance by running in a £50 subscription plate for two-, three- and four-year-olds at the Newmarket Craven meeting. He finished unplaced behind the odds-on favourite Muleteer. For this race, Lap-dog was technically a two-year-old as racehorses in England had their official "birthdays" on 1 May: the modern practice of calculating horses' ages from 1 January was not introduced until 1834, and did not become generally accepted until the late 1850s. On Tuesday 9 May at the Second Spring meeting at Newmarket Lap-dog recorded his first win in a £50 pound race for three-year-olds. He started at odds of 12/1 in a field of eleven runners and won from Lord Exeter's colt Recruit, with the favourite, Lamplighter running unplaced. In both these races his owner is recorded as being "Mr. Wyndham".

At Epsom on 25 May, Lap-dog started at odds of 50/1 for the Derby with John Forth's colt Premier being made the 5/2 favourite. The field of nineteen runners was the largest assembled for the race up to that time. Ridden by George Dockeray, he won from the previously unraced Shakespeare. The runner-up, who made most of the early running appeared to have been given a poor ride by his inexperienced jockey and was considered an unlucky loser. Lap-dog was his owner's fifth Derby winner, establishing a record that was not equalled until Tulyar gave Aga Khan III his fifth winner in 1952.

On his first race after his Derby win, Lap-dog appeared in the Scrub Sweepstakes at Brighton on 31 July and won from two opponents to whom he was conceding seven pounds. Two days later he was entered in a Sweepstakes for three-year-olds at Lewes Racecourse. He was allowed to walk over for the prize money, when the other three horses who had been entered for the race were withdrawn by their owners. The day's "racing" was a poor one: two of the three scheduled races were walkovers and the third was abandoned "for want of horses".

Lap-dog returned to Newmarket in autumn and finished second to Dervise when 8/13 favourite for the Town Plate on 4 October. At the next Newmarket meeting on 16 October he reversed the form to beat Dervise in a subscription race, but both were easily beaten by Lamplighter. The race was described by the Sporting Magazine as "bringing together the most prominent characters of their class" and as confirming Lamplighter as the best colt in the south of England. Lap-dog's final race was a £50 race for three-year-olds at the Newmarket Houghton meeting on 1 November. He finished third of the ten runners behind Shakespeare and Hobgoblin. The result strengthened the views of those who believed that Lap-dog had been lucky to beat Shakespeare at Epsom.

Stud career
Lap-dog was retired to stud for the 1827 season and was based at Mr Day's stables at Houghton Down, near Stockbridge, Hampshire. His stud fee for 1828 was £7 for Thoroughbred mares, with five-shillings for the groom. His advertisement in the Racing Calendar described him as "decidedly the best horse of his year" and a "sure foal-getter". Despite these qualities, he made no real impact as a stallion. He was sold to the American breeder James Jackson and exported to stand as a stallion in Tennessee in 1835. Lap-dog died in Lincoln County, Tennessee in 1838.

Pedigree

 Lap-dog was inbred 4x4 to Woodpecker, meaning that this stallion appears twice in the fourth generation of his pedigree. His dam, the Canopus mare was inbred 3x3x4 to this horse.

References

1823 racehorse births
1838 racehorse deaths
Epsom Derby winners
Racehorses bred in the United Kingdom
Racehorses trained in the United Kingdom
Thoroughbred family 3